Aththintha Marakalage Buddhadasa known as A.M. Buddadhasa was the Chief Minister  of Uva Province  in Sri Lanka from 1995 to 1999. He is the Health Minister in the Provincial Council.

References

Sinhalese politicians
Sri Lankan Buddhists
Chief Ministers of Uva Province
Members of the Uva Provincial Council
Living people
Year of birth missing (living people)
Sinhalese civil servants